The Master Game was a BBC production of televised chess tournaments that ran for seven series on BBC2 from 1976 to 1982.

Series 5 (1979-1980)

Series 6 (1980-1981)

Series 7 (1981-1982)

References 

Master Game
Television shows about chess
Chess-related lists
Chess in the United Kingdom
Chess competitions
1976 in chess